Michael Tritscher (born 6 November 1965) is an Austrian alpine skier. He was born in Schladming.

He finished seventh in the slalom at the 1989 World Championships in Vail, Colorado, and won the bronze medal in slalom at the 1992 Winter Olympics in Albertville.

He has also won several World Cup races.

Achievements

References

1965 births
Living people
Austrian male alpine skiers
Olympic medalists in alpine skiing
Medalists at the 1992 Winter Olympics
Alpine skiers at the 1992 Winter Olympics
Olympic bronze medalists for Austria
Olympic alpine skiers of Austria